Kamysh-Uzyak (Qamışüźäk) is a rural locality (a village) in Matrayevsky Selsoviet, Zilairsky District, Bashkortostan, Russia. The population was 3 as of 2010. There is 1 street.

Geography 
Kamysh-Uzyak is located 69 km east of Zilair (the district's administrative centre) by road. Staroyakupovo is the nearest rural locality.

References 

Rural localities in Zilairsky District